My Past and Thoughts is an extensive autobiography by Alexander Herzen, which he started in the early 1850s and continued to expand and revise throughout his later life. Serialized in Polyarnaya Zvezda, the book in its full form came out as a separate edition after its author's death. In Herzen's lifetime the major parts of the book were translated into English (1855), German (1855) and French (1860-1862). My Past and Thoughts gives a panoramic view on the social and political life in Russian Empire as well as the European West of the mid-19th century. It is considered to be the classic of Russian literature.

Literary significance 

Soviet critic Y. Elsberg calls the book "the novel about a Russian revolutionary and thinker" "with all the contradictions of his inner world" and writes that by its form My Past and Thoughts is a complex combination of memoirs, historical chronicle novel, diary, letters and a biography.

Structure and publication
 Part I. Chapters 1-7. "Childhood and University (1812—1834)". Herzen's life in his father's house. First published in Polyarnaya Zvezda, 1856, Vol.2. The Supplement, "A. Polezhayev", first appeared in "Jail and Exile. From the Notes of Iskander ("Тюрьма  и ссылка. Из записок Искандера"), London, 1854.
 Part II. Chapters 8-18. "Imprisonment and Exile (1834—1838)". The court case and deportation. "Imprisonment and Exile. From the Notes of Iskander ("Тюрьма  и ссылка. Из записок Искандера"), London, 1854. 
 Part III. Chapters 19-24. "Vladimir-on-Klyazma (1838—1839)". The story of his relationship with Natalya Zakharyina. Polyarnaya Zvezda, 1857, Vol.3
 Part IV. "Moscow, Petersburg and Novgorod (1840—1847)". On zapadnichestvo and slavyanofilstvo. Polyarnaya Zvezda: 1855 (Vol.1), 1858 (Vol.4), fragments in 1861 (Vol. 6) and 1862 (Vol. 7, part 2). Two chapters ("N.Kh. Ketcher" and "An 1844 Episode") were published posthumously.
 Part V. "Paris, Italy, Paris (1847—1852). Before and After the Revolution". Herzen's first years abroad. Polyarnaya Zvezda: 1855 (Vols. I, IV), 1859 (Vol. V). What the author called his "most cherished part" of the book, "The Story of a Family Drama" was published posthumously.
 Part VI. "England (1852—1864)". On his life in London after his wife's death. Originally published in fragments, in 1859-1869, in Kolokol and Polyarnaya Zvezda (n all, 5 chapters have been published in full in Herzen's lifetime).
 Part VII. "Russian Emigration". A set of sketches on Mikhail Bakunin, Vasily Kelsiyev and Vladimir Pecherin, among others. Published mostly posthumously ("The Posthumous Collection of A.I. Herzen's Work, Geneva, 1870).
 Part VIII. (1865—1868). On Herzen's European journeys. Polyarnaya Zvezda'', 1869,  Vol. VIII. (In some editions this is the final part of the book).
 Part IX. "Old Letters". Correspondence with Vissarion Belinsky, Pyotr Chaadayev, Timofey Granovsky and others.

References

1870 non-fiction books
Literary memoirs
Russian memoirs
Russian autobiographies
1870 Russian novels